Salvia adoxoides is a perennial plant that is native to Guangxi province in China, found growing in hillside fields at  elevation. Inflorescences are 2-flowered widely spaced verticillasters in racemes, with a  white corolla.

Notes

adoxoides
Flora of China